Walter Richard Mebane, Jr. (born November 30, 1958) is a University of Michigan professor of political science and statistics and an expert on detecting electoral fraud.  He has authored numerous articles on potentially fraudulent election results, including a series of notes on the results of the Iranian presidential election, 2009.  He authored a paper disputing the Organization of American States's claim of fraud in the 2019 Bolivian general election as well.

References

External links 
 Walter Mebane's page at the University of Michigan
 CV at University of Michigan

1958 births
Living people
People from Long Branch, New Jersey
American political scientists
Harvard College alumni
Yale University alumni
University of Michigan faculty